Mike McNamara (born March 28, 1949) is a Canadian former professional ice hockey defenceman.

During the 1972–73 season, McNamara played 19 games in the World Hockey Association with the Quebec Nordiques.

He briefly coached EHC Biel of the National League (NL) from November 2016 to November 2017, when he was fired following bad results.

References

External links
 

1949 births
Living people
Canadian ice hockey defencemen
HC Ajoie players
HC Lugano players
HC Villars players
Maine Nordiques players
Neuchâtel Young Sprinters HC players
Quebec Nordiques (WHA) players
Rhode Island Eagles players
Sir George Williams University alumni
Ice hockey people from Montreal
Canadian expatriate ice hockey players in Switzerland